The Kazakh famine of 1930–1933, also known the Kazakh catastrophe, or Asharshylyk (Kazakh: Ашаршылық, meaning 'famine' or 'hunger') was a famine during which approximately 1.5 million people died in the Kazakh Autonomous Socialist Soviet Republic, then part of the Russian Socialist Federative Soviet Republic in the Soviet Union, of whom 1.3 million were ethnic Kazakhs. An estimated 38 to 42 percent of all Kazakhs died, the highest percentage of any ethnic group killed by the Soviet famine of 1930–1933. Other sources state that as many as 2.0 to 2.3 million died.

The famine began in winter 1930, a full year before the famine in Ukraine, termed the Holodomor, which was at its worst in the years 1931–1933. The famine made Kazakhs a minority in the Kazakh ASSR; it caused the deaths or migration of large numbers of people, and it was not until the 1990s, after the dissolution of the Soviet Union, that the Kazakhs became the largest ethnicity group in Kazakhstan again. Before the famine, around 60% of the republic's residents were ethnic Kazakhs, a proportion greatly reduced to around 38% of the population after the famine. The famine is seen by some scholars to belong to the wider history of collectivization in the Soviet Union and part of the Soviet famine of 1932–1933. Soviet authorities engaged in repressive policies during the famine such as blacklisting entire districts from trading with other areas and shooting thousands of Kazakhs dead during attempts to flee across the border to China. 

Some historians describe the famine as legally recognizable as a genocide perpetrated by the Soviet state, under the definition outlined by the UN; however, some argue otherwise. In Kazakhstan, it is sometimes known as the Goloshchyokin genocide after Filipp Goloshchyokin, who was the First Secretary of the Communist Party in the Kazakh ASSR, to emphasize its man-made nature. It is also known as the Asharshylyk (Kazakh: Ашаршылық, meaning 'famine' or 'hunger').

Overview 
Despite being widely considered to have been mostly man-made, there were some natural factors that exacerbated the crisis. The most important natural factor in the famine was the zud from 1927 to 1928, which was a period of extreme cold in which cattle were starved and were unable to graze. In 1928, the Soviet authorities started a campaign to confiscate cattle from richer Kazakhs, who were called bai, known as Little October. The confiscation campaign was carried out by Kazakhs against other Kazakhs, and it was up to those Kazakhs to decide who was a bai and how much to confiscate from them. This engagement was intended to make Kazakhs active participants in the transformation of Kazakh society. More than 10,000 bais may have been deported due to the campaign against them. The campaign corresponded to arrests of former members of the Alash movement and repression of religious authorities and practices. Kazakhstan's livestock and grain were largely acquired between 1929 and 1932, with one-third of the republic's cereals being requisitioned and more than 1 million tons confiscated in 1930 to provide food for the cities. 

One third of Kazakh livestock was confiscated between 1930 and 1931. Some Kazakhs were expelled from their land to make room for 200,000 "special settlers" and Gulag prisoners, and some of the inadequate food supply in Kazakhstan went to such prisoners and settlers as well. Food aid to the Kazakhs was selectively distributed to eliminate class enemies. Despite orders from the Soviet authorities to avoid discrimination, many Kazakhs were denied food aid as local officials considered them unproductive, and food aid was provided to European workers in the country instead. Despite this, the Kazakhs received some measure of emergency food assistance from the state. However, The Kazakh victims of the famine were widely discriminated against and expelled from virtually every sector of Kazakhstan's society despite the fact that the Soviet government had issued no top-down order for this to be done. In 1932, 32 out of less than 200 districts in Kazakhstan that did not meet grain production quotas were blacklisted, meaning that they were prohibited from trading with other villages. As Historian Sarah Cameron describes it in an interview with Harvard University's Davis Center, "[in] a strategy explicitly modeled upon a technique that was used against starving Ukrainians, several regions of Kazakhstan were blacklisted. That essentially entraps starving Kazakhs in zones of death where no food could be found." Near the end of the Kazakh famine, Filipp Goloshchyokin was replaced with Levon Mirzoyan, who was repressive particularly toward famine refugees and denied food aid to areas run by cadres who asked for more food for their regions using, in the words of Cameron, "teary telegrams"; in one instance under Mirzoyan's rule, a plenipotentiary shoved food aid documents into his pocket and had a wedding celebration instead of transferring them for a whole month while hundreds of Kazakhs starved.

Prominent Kazakh writer, Gabit Musirepov reporting finding corpses "stacked like firewood" by the roadside in the Turgai district of Kazakhstan. Another first account testified that “It is not rare to meet a Kazakh family, fleeing from who knows where and dragging behind them a sled, on top of which lies the corpse of a child, who died along the way.”

In scholar James Richter's Famine, Memory, and Politics in the Post-Soviet Space: Contrasting Echoes of Collectivization in Ukraine and Kazakhstan, published by Cambridge University Press, many testimonies from survivors are documented:"My first memory is of the moon. It was autumn, cold and we were on the tramp somewhere. Wrapped up, the cart swayed beneath me. A sudden stop, and I saw in the black sky this enormous moon. It was full, round and shone brightly. I lay on my back and couldn’t tear myself from the sight for a long time. Turning over, I could clearly see on the ground some kind of thickets with stretched-out, crooked branches; there were a lot of them on both sides of the road: they were people. Stiff and silent they lay on the ground. … It was ’31 and we were then moving from a ramshackle aul to Turgai."

Casualties 
Kazakhstan included some of the regions affected severely by famine, percentage-wise, although more people died in famine in Soviet Ukraine, which began a year later. In addition to the Kazakh famine of 1919–1922, Kazakhstan lost more than half of its population in 10–15 years due to the actions of the Soviet state. The two Soviet censuses indicated that the number of Kazakhs in Kazakhstan dropped from 3,637,612 in 1926 to 2,181,520 in 1937. Ethnic minorities in Kazakhstan were also significantly affected. The Ukrainian population in Kazakhstan decreased from 859,396 to 549,859 (a reduction of almost 36% of their population) while other ethnic minorities in Kazakhstan lost 12% and 30% of their populations. Ukrainians who died in Kazakhstan are sometimes considered victims of the Holodomor.

Refugees 

Due to starvation, 665,000 Kazakhs fled the famine with their cattle outside Kazakhstan to China, Mongolia, Afghanistan, Iran, Turkey, and the Soviet republics of Uzbekistan, Kyrgyzstan, Turkmenistan, Tajikistan, and Russia in search of food and employment in the new industrialization sites of Western Siberia with 900,000 head of cattle. The Soviet government worked later to repatriate them. This repatriation process could be brutal, as Kazakhs homes were broken into with refugee and non-refugee ethnic Kazakhs being forcibly expelled onto train cars without food, heating, or water. Seventy percent of the refugees survived and the rest died due to epidemics and hunger. Refugees were integrated into collective farms as they were repatriated where many were too weak to work, and in a factory within Semipalatinsk half the refugees were fired within a few days with the other half being denied food rations. 

Another estimate is that 1.1 million people fled, the vast majority of them Kazakhs. As the refugees fled the famine, the Soviet government made some attempts to stop them. In one case, relief dealers placed food in the back of a truck to attract refugees, and then locked the refugees inside the truck and dumped them in the middle of the mountains; the fate of these refugees is unknown. Thousands of Kazakhs were shot dead, and some were raped in their attempt to flee to China. The flight of refugees was framed by authorities as a progressive occurrence of nomads moving away from their 'primitive' lifestyle. Famine refugees were suspected by OGPU officials of maintaining counterrevolutionary, bai, and kulak tendencies which was reinforced by some refugees engaging in crime in the republics they arrived in.

Cannibalism 
Some of the starving in Kazakhstan resorted to cannibalism, ranging from consuming corpses to actively murdering each other in order to eat.

Aftermath and legacy 
Two thirds of the Kazakh survivors of the famine were successfully sedentarized due to the 80% reduction of their herds, the impossibility of resuming pastoral activity in the immediate post-famine environment, and the repatriation and resettlement program undertaken by Soviet authorities. Despite this, Niccolò Pianciola says that the Soviet campaign to destroy nomadism was quickly rejected after the famine, and that nomadism even experienced a resurgence during World War II after the transfer of livestock from Nazi-occupied territories.

Ibragim Khisamutdinov, who lived through the famine as a young boy, saw starving Kazakhs dying in the streets on his way to school. More than 50 years later, he noted, "To this day, I can hear the desperate cries of the dying and their calls for help." 

A monument for the famine's victims was constructed in 2017. The Turkic Council has described the famine as a "criminal Stalinist ethnic policy". A genocide remembrance day is commenced on 31 May for the victims of the famine.

Assessment, Legality, and Censorship 

Like the Holodomor, there is heated debate as to whether or not the famine fits in with the legal definition of genocide, as defined by the UN. In November 1991, the Kazakhstan parliament created a committee, chaired by Historian Manash Kozybayev, to investigate the famine and its causes. A year later, the commission reported out that “the magnitude of the tragedy was so monstrous that we can, with full moral authority, designate it as a manifestation of the politics of genocide."

Europeans in Kazakhstan had disproportionate power in the party, which has been argued as a cause of why indigenous nomads suffered the worst part of the collectivization process rather than the European sections of the country. Notably, many scholars have compared the internal colonization of Kazakhs as similar to American policies towards Native Americans such as the Sioux, who were similarly nomads. Niccolò Pianciola argues that the Soviet authorities undertook a campaign of persecution against the nomads in the Kazakhs, believing that the destruction of the 'class' was a worthy sacrifice for the collectivization of Kazakhstan., and that from Lemkin's point of view on genocide all nomads of the Soviet Union were victims of the crime, not just the Kazakhs. However, other nomads within Soviet territory were also Indigenous Turkic or Mongolic Central and North Asian peoples, had similar treatment by the Soviet Union, and discrimination that continues to this day. Kazakhs and other Central Asians are still referred to in Russian sometimes aziaty, or as Churka or Churki (Russian: Чурка), a racial slur that means "darkie" or "block of wood". 

A historian of the revolution and author Vladimir Burtsev, who knew Filipp Goloshchyokin, characterized him in his writing:This is a typical Leninist. This is a man who does not stop the blood. This trait is especially noticeable in his nature: the executioner, cruel, with some elements of degeneration. In party life he was arrogant, was a demagogue, a cynic. He did not count the Kazakhs as people at all. Goloshchekin did not have time to appear in Kazakhstan, as he stated that there is no Soviet power, and it is "necessary" to orchestrate a "Small October".Historian Stephen G. Wheatcroft believes that the high expectations of central planners were sufficient to demonstrate their ignorance of the ultimate consequences of their actions. Wheatcroft views the state's policies during the famine as "criminal acts of negligence", though not as intentional murder or genocide. However Historian Sarah Cameron, author of The Hungry Steppe: Famine, Violence, and the Making of Soviet Kazakhstan, stated in an interview with Harvard University's Davis Center that "Moscow’s sweeping program of state-led transformation clearly anticipates the cultural disruption of Kazakh society. And there's evidence to indicate that the Kazakh famine fits an expanded definition of genocide." She also says:"I think if we look historically, we can find that we've often been quick to dismiss violence committed against mobile peoples. We rationalize it as part of a process necessary to civilize so-called backward peoples. 

When the Kazakh famine is mentioned in the scholarly literature, it's often referred to as a miscalculation by Stalin, a tragedy, a misunderstanding of cultures. But such depictions, I would argue, downplay the disaster's very violent nature, and seem to stress or imply that the Kazakh famine originated from natural causes, which of course it didn't.

I show in my book, there's nothing inevitable about this famine. Pastoral nomadism is not a backwards way of life, but rather it was a highly sophisticated and adaptive system. Nor can the famine itself be attributed to a simple miscalculation by Stalin as such depictions would seem to suggest."Regarding the legal definition of genocide as determined by the UN, Michael Ellman states that it "seems to be an example of 'negligent genocide' which falls outside the scope of the UN Convention". Historian Isabelle Ohayon stated she found "no evidence nor motive for the deliberate starvation" of the Kazakh population, and concludes that the famine did not constitute a genocide under international juridical standards, and therefore labelling it was an "empty exercise". Maya Mehra concludes that the famine was caused by intentional act of violence on part of Stalin and the Soviet state, but it was not in the legal sense a genocide. In Red Famine: Stalin's War on Ukraine, Pulitzer Prize winner Anne Applebaum says that the UN definition of genocide is overly narrow due to the Soviet influence on the Genocide Convention, as extensively documented by scholars such as Anton Weiss-Wendt in his book The Soviet Union and the Gutting of the UN Genocide Convention

Instead of a broad definition that would have included Soviet crimes, Applebaum writes that genocide "came to mean the physical elimination of an entire ethnic group, in a manner similar to the Holocaust. The Holodomor does not meet that criterion ... This is hardly surprising, given that the Soviet Union itself helped shape the language precisely in order to prevent Soviet crimes, including the Holodomor, from being classified as 'genocide.'"

Historian Robert Kindler disagrees with calling the famine a genocide, commenting that doing so masks the culpability of lower-level cadres who were locally rooted among the Kazakhs themselves. Kindler goes as far as to say that speaking in terms of genocide with the Holodomor and the famine eclipses “how the nations themselves were responsible for catastrophes” rather than the Soviet Union. However, Sarah Cameron stated that the Soviet decision to have Kazakhs serve as lower-level cadres was "a strategy purposefully designed to shatter old allegiances and sow violent conflict in the Kazakh Awul" 

In Famine, Memory, and Politics in the Post-Soviet Space: Contrasting Echoes of Collectivization in Ukraine and Kazakhstan, James Richter highlights:The link between the genocide argument and the use of Kazakh language was made explicit by the historian Kaidar Aldazhumanov in an interview with Radio Azattyq in 2014. In this interview, Aldazhumanov suggests that foreign scholars and even Russian speakers at home do not regard the famine as genocide because “they cannot read witnesses or evidence in the Kazakh language and rely fundamentally on research in Russian…. They do not want to know anything about research in the Kazakh language, nor do Russian researchers or Russian speakers living in Kazakhstan”It is also important to note that Kazakhstan's government maintains close relations with Russia today, which contributes to its official documentation and statements on the famine as genocide. This connection is based on lasting Soviet ties, intimidation, and the dependence of Kazakhstan's economy on Russian imports, especially basic items such as food and clothing, and 40% of Kazakhstan's market needs are covered by Russia. As Anne Applebaum explains current denialism, "Putinism is an oligarchic autocracy that would be in trouble if there was complete freedom of speech, freedom of the press, and the rule of law." Only recently with the invasion of Ukraine in 2022 has there been notable disconnect between the allies.  

Former President Nursultan Nazarbayev of Kazakhstan was noted as careful while speaking of the famine. However, an official inscription at the monument for the famine victims quoted him stating “the hunger that put an entire nation on the brink of disappearing, will never be forgotten”, which lends credence to the common speculation that he was trying to appease Moscow in fear of retribution for recognizing the famine as genocide.

See also 
 Ethnic demography of Kazakhstan

References

Bibliography 
 
 Conquest, Robert, The Harvest of Sorrow: Soviet Collectivization and the Terror-famine, Edmonton: The University of Alberta Press in Association with the Canadian Institute of Ukrainian Studies, 1986.
 
 
 Sahni, Kalpana. Crucifying the Orient: Russian orientalism and the colonization of Caucasus and Central Asia. Bangkok: White Orchid Press, 1997.

1932 in the Soviet Union
1933 in the Soviet Union 
1932 disasters in the Soviet Union
1933 disasters in the Soviet Union
Famine-genocide of 1930–1933
20th-century famines
Famine-genocide of 1930–1933
Kazakhstan of 1932–33
Genocides in Asia
Human rights abuses in the Soviet Union
Human rights abuses in Kazakhstan
Joseph Stalin
Persecution of Kazakhs